Chah Palasi (also Romanized as Chāh Plāsī) is a village in Golestan Rural District, in the Central District of Sirjan County, Kerman Province, Iran. At the 2006 census, its population was 24, in 6 families.

References 

Populated places in Sirjan County